Wilfred Hudson Cooke (5 October 1915 – 18 December 1985) was an English professional footballer who played as an inside forward.

Career
Born in Crewe, Cooke played for Leeds United and Bradford City. For Bradford City he made 21 appearances in the Football League, scoring 2 goals; he also scored 1 goal in 2 FA Cup appearances. He later played for Fulham. Known as Jimmy, he was on the books of Crewe Alexandra after the war, joining Nantwich Town as player-coach ahead of the inaugural season of the Mid-Cheshire League in 1948.

Sources

References

1915 births
1985 deaths
English footballers
Leeds United F.C. players
Bradford City A.F.C. players
Fulham F.C. players
Crewe Alexandra F.C. players
Nantwich Town F.C. players
English Football League players
Association football inside forwards
Sportspeople from Crewe